The European Union (Approvals) Act 2015 (c. 37) was an Act of the Parliament of the United Kingdom which under section 8 of the European Union Act 2011 amended Article 352 of the Treaty on the Functioning of the European Union to allow for Macedonia to become an observer in the work of the European Union Agency for Fundamental Rights. It received royal assent on 17 December 2015.

The Act was repealed by the European Union (Withdrawal) Act 2018.

See also
Treaty on the Functioning of the European Union
 List of Acts of the Parliament of the United Kingdom relating to the European Communities / European Union

References

United Kingdom Acts of Parliament 2015
Acts of the Parliament of the United Kingdom relating to the European Union
Repealed United Kingdom Acts of Parliament